The State Museum of Modern Western Art ( GMNZI) was a museum in Moscow. It originated in the merger of the 1st and 2nd Museums of Modern Western Painting in 1923. It was based on the collection of paintings assembled by Sergei Schukin and Ivan Morozov. It was shut down on 6 March 1948 by Stalin and its works split between the Hermitage Museum in St. Petersburg and the Pushkin Museum in Moscow.

It was the first state-funded modern art gallery in world when it opened in 1919. In 2013 it was reported it was being resurrected online.  It was on Prechistenka Street. In 1944 during World War II, the collection was moved to Novosibirsk
1936 .

References

Sources 
 К истории международных связей Государственного музея нового западного искусства (1922—1939) / Авт.-сост. Н. В. Яворская; Под ред. И. Е. Даниловой. — М., 1978 (Из архива ГМИИ / Гос. музей изобраз. искусств им. А. С. Пушкина. — Вып. 2). — 475 с.
 Н. В. Яворская. История Государственного музея нового западного искусства (по документам и воспоминаниям) // Искусствознание. — 1/02. — М., 2002. — С. 595–603.
 Н. В. Яворская. История Государственного музея нового западного искусства. Москва. 1918–1948. — М.: ГМИИ им. А. С. Пушкина, 2012. — 480 с.: ил., портр. — ISBN 978-5-903190-50-8 Текст книги был завершён в 1989 году, издан по авторской рукописи при участии ГМИИ им. А. С. Пушкина.

1923 establishments in Russia
1948 disestablishments in the Soviet Union
Defunct museums in Russia
Defunct art museums and galleries